, also chippan are an Okinawan confection. Kippan date from the time of the Ryūkyū Kingdom. Understood to have been originally introduced from Fuzhou some three hundred years ago, they were served to visiting dignitaries of the Imperial Chinese Missions. Available to the people at large from the Meiji period, today they continue to be made only by one sixth-generation purveyor in Naha. Kippan have been recognized by the Agency for Cultural Affairs as a constituent element of the Japan Heritage "story" Traditional Ryūkyūan Cuisine, Awamori, and Performing Arts of Okinawa that have continued unbroken since the time of the Ryūkyū Kingdom.

See also
 Wagashi
 Japanese citrus
 Sātā andagī
 Chinsukō

References

Okinawan cuisine
Japanese desserts and sweets